Dmitri Leonidovich Romanowsky (sometimes spelled Dmitry and Romanowski, ; 1861–1921) was a Russian physician who is best known for his invention of an eponymous histological stain called Romanowsky stain. It paved the way for the discovery and diagnosis of microscopic pathogens, such as malarial parasites.

Romanowsky was born in 1861 in Pskov Governorate, Russia. He attended the 6th Saint Petersburg Gymnasium. In 1880, he enrolled at the St. Petersburg University. He enrolled for two courses: natural science (physics and mathematics) and medicine. He concentrated on medicine in 1882 for a preparatory course to the Military Medical Academy. He graduated with honors in 1886. On 30 November 1886, he was appointed as a junior resident of the Ivangorod military hospital. After one month, he was transferred to the Revel local infirmary as an associate doctor. In 1889, he was attached to the Saint Petersburg Nikolaevsky Military hospital. He initially worked at the clinical department, and from May 1890, he was the head of the eye department. He obtained his medical degree in 1891. It was in that year that he published a paper in which he described the technique for staining malarial parasites from blood samples.

References

1861 births
1921 deaths
Saint Petersburg State University alumni
Russian ophthalmologists
19th-century physicians from the Russian Empire